Oskar Saier (12 August 1932 in Wagensteig – 3 January 2008 in Freiburg im Breisgau) was a German Roman Catholic clergyman who served as archbishop of Freiburg from 1978 until 2002.

Works 
 "Communio" in der Lehre des Zweiten Vatikanischen Konzils. Eine rechtsbegriffliche Untersuchung (= Münchener theologische Studien, 3, Kanonistische Abteilung, file 32), Verlag Hueber, Ismaning 1973, (also doctoral thesis, Munich, Faculty of Theology, 1970).

Literatur 
 Christoph Schmider, Die Freiburger Bischöfe. 175 Jahre Erzbistum Freiburg. Eine Geschichte in Lebensbildern. Herder Verlag, Freiburg i. Br. 2002, ISBN 3-451-27847-2.

Weblinks 

 
 
 Article in GCatholic.org

References

Sources
 
  
 Life of Oskar Saier (Freiburg Ordinariate)

Archbishops of Freiburg
People from Breisgau-Hochschwarzwald
1932 births
2008 deaths
20th-century German Roman Catholic bishops
Knights Commander of the Order of Merit of the Federal Republic of Germany
Recipients of the Order of Merit of Baden-Württemberg
20th-century German Roman Catholic priests